Balvan may refer to:
Balvan, Bulgaria, in Veliko Tarnovo Municipality
Balvan, Kermanshah, a village in Iran
Balvan Point, on Antarctica

See also
Balavan (disambiguation)